Of the five von Wright brothers, three were artists:

Magnus von Wright (1805–1868)
Wilhelm von Wright (1810–1887)
Ferdinand von Wright (1822–1906)

These ornithologists, scientists, nature illustrators and artists were born in Haminalahti near Kuopio in Finland.

Magnus and Wilhelm von Wright began the illustrative work Svenska Foglar ("Swedish birds") in August 1828. The work was financed by count Nils Bonde. The works was ready by 1838 and contains 178 lithographs.

Galleri

See also
Von Wright

External links
Naturally - The von Wright brothers

Finnish ornithologists
Finnish painters
Sibling trios